Below is a list of  nominations and appointments to the Department of Agriculture by Joe Biden, the 46th president of the United States. , according to tracking by The Washington Post and Partnership for Public Service, 10 nominees have been confirmed, 3 nominees are being considered by the Senate, 1 position does not have a nominee, 19 appointments have been made to positions that don't require Senate confirmation, and 5 positions do not have an appointee.

Color key 
 Denotes appointees awaiting Senate confirmation.

 Denotes appointees serving in an acting capacity.

 Denotes appointees who have left office or offices which have been disbanded.

Leadership

Office of the Secretary

Farm Production and Conservation

Food, Nutrition and Consumer Services

Food Safety

Marketing and Regulatory Programs

Natural Resources and Environment

Research, Education, and Economics

Rural Development

Trade and Foreign Agriculture Affairs

Office of Congressional Relations

Office of Civil Rights

USDA Agencies, Corporations & Services

See also 
 Cabinet of Joe Biden, for the vetting process undergone by top-level roles including advice and consent by the Senate
 List of executive branch 'czars' e.g. Special Advisor to the President

Notes 

Confirmations by roll call vote

Confirmations by voice vote

References 

 Biden
Agriculture